Gustav Kaufmann (23 August 1918 – 20 January 2015) was a Liechtenstein sports shooter. He competed in the 50 metre rifle, three positions and 50 metre rifle, prone events at the 1960 Summer Olympics.

References

1918 births
2015 deaths
Liechtenstein male sport shooters
Olympic shooters of Liechtenstein
Shooters at the 1960 Summer Olympics